Abduhamid Juraev (10 October 1932 – 5 June 2005) Isfara, Tajikistan was a Tajik mathematician.  He published many articles and books.

References
Iraj Bashiri, Prominent Tajik Figures of the Twentieth Century, International Borbad Foundation, Academy of Sciences of Tajikistan, Dushanbe, 2003.

External links
Books by Abduhamid Juraev

1932 births
2005 deaths
People from Isfara
Soviet mathematicians
Tajikistani mathematicians
Tajik National University alumni
Communist Party of the Soviet Union members
Members of the Tajik Academy of Sciences